Cimino (plural cimini) may refer to
Cimino (surname)
Cimino family in Italy
Cimino fistula, an arteriovenous fistula 
Soriano nel Cimino, a town and comune in central Italy
A Piano for Mrs. Cimino, a 1982 American TV drama film

See also
 Cimini (disambiguation)